Som du vill ha mej (As You Want Me) is a Swedish romantic comedy film from 1943 directed by Gösta Cederlund. The script was written by Kid Bruncrona based on Tancred Ibsen's film script for The Dangerous Game, in turn based on Alex Brinchmann's play Karusell.

The film premiered in Sweden on March 15, 1943. Gustaf Wally appears in the film as a singer and dancer in one of his few film roles.

Plot
The outgoing architect Gösta asks his friend Fredrik, a doctor, for help. Gösta thinks that his wife Gunilla is a bit bored, and Fredrik is persuaded to test an invigorating injection on her. What they do not know is that Gunilla has overheard the entire conversation, and she decides to teach the gentlemen, in particular Gösta, a lesson. Gunilla changes in both character and appearance, and she begins a romance with a stylish conductor, all to make her husband jealous.

Cast
Karin Ekelund as Gunilla
Lauritz Falk as Gösta the architect
Stig Järrel as Fredrik, the doctor
Georg Rydeberg as Stefan, the director
Gösta Cederlund as Birger
Marianne Löfgren as Mrs. Sandeman
Gustaf Wally as the singer
Karin Kavli as Sylvia, the opera singer
Astrid Bodin as the servant
Marianne Gyllenhammar as the secretary
Cécile Ossbahr as the telephone operator

References

External links

Som du vill ha mej at the Swedish Film Database

Swedish comedy films
1943 comedy films
1943 films